The Windsor Tower was an office building in the financial center of Madrid, Spain. The building was gutted by a huge fire on February 12, 2005, and partially collapsed; it has since been demolished.

Characteristics of the building 
The tower was designed in 1974 by a team of six important Spanish architects and was constructed between 1975 and 1979.

Its distinctive appearance was due to its elemental geometry, lacking composite elements. Its façade was completely covered by reflective glass-like panels that mirrored the sky of Madrid, diminishing its visual impact. The structure was divided into two halves by a mechanical floor without windows. It was a very solid building, with a central core of reinforced concrete that resisted the high temperatures of the fire without collapsing. The building did not have a fire sprinkler system. Sprinklers were being retrofitted, but they were not yet operable when the building was destroyed by fire.

Disaster 
Around midnight, on Saturday, February 12, 2005, a fire was detected on the 21st floor of the building. The fire spread quickly throughout the entire building, leading to the collapse of the outermost, steel parts of the upper floors. It took firefighters about 24 hours to extinguish the fire. In the aftermath, seven firefighters were injured, but nobody was killed during the disaster. However, the building was a total loss, which was arguably the worst in Madrid's history. The fire was blamed on an electrical fault.

The city council of Madrid covered the cost of demolishing the remains of the building, thought to be some EUR 22 million (USD $32.5 million). Demolition was completed in August 2005, and a 23-story replacement called Torre Titania was built from 2007 to 2011.

See also 
Skyscraper fire

References

External links 

 elmundo.es, Arde el Winsor (Windsor burns). Images of the fire.
  BBC Madrid skyscraper faces collapse
 BBC News UK Edition,  Commuter chaos after Madrid blaze.
 CNN.com, Madrid alert after skyscraper fire.
 Borneo Bulletin, Arsonists may be behind Madrid fire.
 NAMC Worldwide Newsroom, Horrific Fire at the Windsor Tower in Madrid Spain Shakes the Capital.
 NEWS24.com, Silhouettes in Madrid inferno.

Demolished buildings and structures in Madrid
History of Madrid
Skyscraper office buildings in Madrid
Office buildings completed in 1979
Former skyscrapers
Buildings and structures demolished in 2005
Buildings and structures in Cuatro Caminos neighborhood, Madrid
2005 fires in Europe
Fires in Spain
Building collapses in 2005
Building collapses in Europe
Building collapses caused by fire
2005 disasters in Spain